Mikhail Mikhaylovich Pomortsev (July 24, 1851, Vasilyevshchina – July 2, 1916, all n.s.) was a Russian military officer, meteorologist and engineer. He invented a Nephoscope in 1894. A lunar crater Pomortsev is named after him. 

One of the pioneers in the field of Russian aeronautics and rocketry, Pomortsev conducted research into solid-propellant rockets in the early 20th century. In his military career, Pomortsev reached the rank of Artillery General; he taught at the Mikhailovskaya Military Artillery Academy in St Petersburg.

References

Поморцев Михаил Михайлович in the Great Soviet Encyclopedia, 3rd edition 1969–1978 (Russian)

1851 births
1916 deaths
People from Parfinsky District
Russian meteorologists
Russian geographers
Russian engineers
Russian inventors
Imperial Russian Army generals